Thomas Waller (fl. 1421–1435) of Guildford, Surrey, was an English politician who was a Member (MP) of the Parliament of England for Guildford in May 1421, December 1421 and 1435.

Waller was married to a woman named Joan.

References

Year of birth missing
Year of death missing
English MPs May 1421
Members of Parliament for Guildford
English MPs December 1421
English MPs 1435